Angel's Share was a speakeasy-style bar in the East Village of Manhattan, New York City. The Japanese-style bar was one of the pioneering establishments in the cocktail renaissance.

The bar had an outsized influence on the craft cocktail movement, and was among several Japanese-owned businesses on a section of Stuyvesant Street, developed by Tadao "Tony" Yoshida. The bar directly influenced Sasha Petraske, who founded Milk & Honey, which inspired bars around the world.

The upscale craft cocktail bar had a "romantic room" and a view of Stuyvesant Triangle. It opened in 1993. The bar utilized elements of Japanese bartending, including measuring, stirring, and shaking drinks with precision: something still practiced in Japan while the U.S. was in a "dark age" in the bar industry.

Pioneering bartender Sasha Petraske began visiting Angel's Share in the 1990s, ordering its classics and learning the precision involved in Japanese bartending before opening his own influential bar, Milk & Honey, in 1999.

The bar became immensely popular by around 2015, with long lines and waits of up to an hour, taking away from its element of secrecy. The bar's owners decided to open another speakeasy, sometimes referred to as an annex of Angel's Share, above Sharaku, a restaurant owned by Yoshida. The bar was oriented more toward classic cocktails, allowing its bartenders to moreso highlight classic Japanese bartending techniques.

The bar operated for nearly 30 years in its location in the East Village. It faced eviction as reported in mid-March 2022; an old lease agreement ended and a massive rent hike would have taken place. The bar's last day was March 31, 2022, involving a line stretching down the block until last call. Later in 2022, the bar reopened as a summer pop-up in the Hotel Eventi in Midtown. The pop-up is also hidden, and has nearly all the same staff, some of the old tables and chairs, and some of the original cocktails. The hotel will eventually open its own speakeasy in the space, and the bar's owner, Erina Yoshida, intends to reopen Angel's Share in a permanent location.

In April 2022, the bar's eight-year head bartender Takuma Watanabe opened Martiny’s, his own bar in the Gramercy neighborhood.

In March 2023, it was announced that the bar will reopen, own and run by Erina Yoshida. It will be located at 45 Grove Street in Greenwich Village.

Further reading

References

External links
 Pop-up website

East Village, Manhattan
Speakeasies
2022 disestablishments in New York City
1993 establishments in New York City
Defunct drinking establishments in Manhattan